Telus Optik TV is a product of Telus Communications, a subsidiary of Telus Corporation, that provides IPTV service in the Canadian provinces of British Columbia, Alberta, and Quebec. The service offers over 630 digital channels, including more than 100 in HD. Despite its name, the service is available to both Fibre To The Node (FTTN) or Fibre To The Home (FTTH) clients, with FTTN implementations using telephone lines instead of fibre optics for a portion of the connection. Telus launched IPTV service in November 2005 to customers in select Alberta communities. As of February 2017, over 1 million customers are subscribed to the Optik TV. Major competitors include satellite services Shaw Direct and Bell Satellite TV, as well as various cable and communications companies across British Columbia and Alberta, such as Shaw, Novus and Eastlink.

Other television services

Pik TV
Telus Pik TV is an internet television service that offers live TV and on demand video from 125 television networks. Pik TV is available as an add-on to residential Telus Internet customers. The service is named after the pick-and-pay television model, where customers purchase channels à la carte.

The service is available at two pricing points:
 Basic includes up to 23 standard channels, plus the core Crave service or five free à la carte TV channels.
 Pik Max includes up to 23 standard channels, plus Crave, ten free à la carte TV channels, three Sportsnet channels and five TSN channels. Pik Max promotions may offer the Apple TV 4K on contract.

Pik TV service is available on iPhone, iPad, iPod Touch, Apple TV, Android, and web browsers.

Satellite TV 
From June 2009 to April 2018, Telus resold BCE's satellite Bell Satellite TV service in parts of Alberta and British Columbia as Telus Satellite TV. The agreement was designed to allow Telus the ability to offer a quadruple play of services in markets where it had not yet deployed Optik TV, while also allowing Bell to increase its television market share in Western Canada. The Telus-branded service co-exists with the Bell-branded version of Bell TV, which is still offered in the markets that Telus Satellite TV is offered. With the resale agreement ending March 31, 2018, Telus continues to support existing subscribers, but no longer accepts new ones.

Telus Presents 
Telus Presents is a collection of, as described by Telus, "hard-to-find" international programs available on demand at no additional charge to Optik TV and Pik TV subscribers in Alberta and B.C., introduced in October 2020. Programs available as part of the collection include I Hate Suzie and The Newsreader.

See also 
 Telus

References

External links 
 Official Telus Optik TV website
 Official Telus Satellite TV website
 Telus Quebec

2005 establishments in British Columbia
Cable and DBS companies of Canada
Telus
IPTV companies of Canada